is a Japanese former long jumper who competed in the 1960 Summer Olympics and in the 1964 Summer Olympics.

References

1940 births
Living people
Japanese male long jumpers
Japanese male triple jumpers
Japanese male sprinters
Olympic male long jumpers
Olympic male triple jumpers
Olympic male sprinters
Olympic athletes of Japan
Athletes (track and field) at the 1960 Summer Olympics
Athletes (track and field) at the 1964 Summer Olympics
Asian Games gold medalists for Japan
Asian Games silver medalists for Japan
Asian Games gold medalists in athletics (track and field)
Asian Games medalists in athletics (track and field)
Athletes (track and field) at the 1962 Asian Games
Athletes (track and field) at the 1966 Asian Games
Medalists at the 1962 Asian Games
Medalists at the 1966 Asian Games
Universiade silver medalists for Japan
Universiade medalists in athletics (track and field)
Medalists at the 1961 Summer Universiade
20th-century Japanese people
21st-century Japanese people